Bogie exchange is a system for operating railway wagons on two or more gauges to overcome difference in the track gauge.  To perform a bogie exchange, a car is converted from one gauge to another by removing the bogies or trucks (the chassis containing the wheels and axles of the car), and installing a new bogie with differently spaced wheels.  It is generally limited to wagons and carriages, though the bogies on diesel locomotives can be exchanged if enough time is available.

Wagons and carriages
Bogie wagons can have their gauge changed by lifting them off one set of bogies and putting them back down again on another set of bogies.  The pin that centres the bogies and the hoses and fittings for the brakes must be compatible.  A generous supply of bogies of each gauge is needed to accommodate the ebb and flow of traffic. The bogies and wagons also need to have standardized hooks, etc., where they may be efficiently lifted. The two wheel sets on four-wheel wagons can be changed as well if the wagon has been designed accordingly.

Engines

Steam 
Steam locomotives can be designed for more than one gauge, by having, for example, reversible wheel hubs that suit two alternative gauges.  This was done in the 1930s and beyond in Victoria for possible gauge conversion, though no engines were ever converted in this manner other than one heritage engine (R766).  Some  Garratt locomotives of East Africa were designed for easy conversion to  gauge, though again none ever was.

In 1944, the LMS re-gauged a pair of "Jinty" 0-6-0 tank locomotives – originally built to UK  – for use on its  gauge Northern Counties Committee (NCC) lines in Northern Ireland; re-designated as Class Y, they largely undertook shunting work on dockyard lines in Belfast. The re-gauging was performed by simply reversing the wheel centres so that the spokes dished outwards.

Diesel
Diesel locomotives have bogies like wagons and carriages, only with more cables for the traction motors and take a little longer to convert.

Since the  networks are not all connected to each other, being separated by deserts or lines of other gauges, they are bogie-exchanged or piggybacked on road or rail vehicles when transferred between these networks.

Raising or lowering

Raise 
The simplest way to carry out bogie exchange is to lift the wagons off the bogies and replace them back on new bogies. This may require the wagons in a train to be uncoupled, and continuous brakes disconnected. If the wagons are swung out of the way by an overhead hoist, they may sway, which wastes time settling them down.

The Nutter hoist, patented in 1871, used screw jacks to lift cars off of their bogies.  The Imboden railway-car lifter, from 1875, used a steam cylinder to wedge the car into the air.

Lower
Another way of carrying out bogie exchange is to lower the bogies onto a trolley in a pit, after which the trolleys are rolled out of the way and others return.  This may allow the train couplings and continuous brakes to remain connected.  In addition, the bogies never need leave a solid surface, so they can be wheeled in and out more quickly. This method was used at Dry Creek railway station, Adelaide.

Charles Tisdale patented a system of ramps and moving supports for lowering the trucks out from under a railroad car in 1873.  George Atkinson patented a hoist and transfer table arrangement in 1882; this dropped the bogies from under a car and shift them to the side.  Ramsay's apparatus patented in 1884 used hydraulic jacks to support the car while lowering the track with the bogies out from under it.

National

Australia
Between 1961 and 1995, Australia had five bogie exchange centres, which opened and closed as gauge conversion work proceeded. All the wagons involved had wagon codes ending in "X", such as VLX.

The centres were:
 Dynon, Melbourne, Victoria
 Wodonga near Albury on state border.
 Port Pirie, South Australia
 Peterborough, South Australia
 Dry Creek, Adelaide, South Australia - the youngest and most modern

The busiest facility was that at Dynon, in a typical year (1981–82), 24,110 wagons were bogie exchanged, an average of 66 per day.  This was done by one shift of 18 men, compared with the 100 men required if the same amount of freight were transferred wagon to wagon.

Belarus

Bolivia

Canada

China
A bogie exchange station exists at the Chinese border to Mongolia. Both the Moscow-Beijing passenger train (Trans-Siberian) and freight trains get their bogies exchanged. Mongolia has , China has . Also, a bogie exchange station was placed farther east at the Russian–Chinese border crossing at Zabaykalsk/Manzhouli.
Also, China and ex-soviet countries use the different type coupler (Janney and SA-3). An adapter may be used.

Finland
A bogie exchange station exists in the Port of Turku with a short stretch of  gauge railway. Freight cars get their bogies exchanged. SeaRail train ferries go from Germany and Sweden. They carry no passenger trains, and passengers must walk to Turku Harbour railway station opposite the ferry terminals. Finland has  broad gauge.

Germany
In 1898 Emil Breidsprecher, a director of the Marienburg–Mława railway and a future professor at the Königliche Technische Hochschule zu Danzig, invented a system that allowed to change wheelsets in wagons that travelled across a break of gauge, without the need to unload them first. In September 1901 a facility was installed at the then German-Russian border at Iłowo. The system was used until 1914 on some railway border crossings between Russia and states using standard gauge; known locations, in addition to Iłowo, are Łódź (then an industrial centre served by both standard and broad gauge railway lines) and Novoselytsia (then Austrian-Russian border), there were also some small installations to meet local demand. As of 1938, the sole facility operated at Zdolbuniv at the then Polish-Soviet border. 

A bogie exchange station in the port of Mukran serves train ferries that go to and from Russia, Latvia, and Lithuania, which have  broad gauge.

Iran

Kazakhstan

Moldova
 Ungheni-Iași
 Cantemir-Falciu
 Giurgiulești-Galați

North Korea
The bogies of the direct sleeping car Moscow – Pyongyang, which runs twice monthly, are exchanged there.

Peru
This change was completed by October 2010.

Romania

Russia 
   Zabaikalsk (450 km from Chita) with China
   Grodekovo (116 km from Ussuriisk and 224 km from Vladivostok) with China
   Khasan - North Korea (315 km from Vladivostok). 
  Kholmsk, Sakhalin Island. The bogie exchange is necessary to enable Russian mainland cars to run on the Sakhalin railways, which use the  gauge.
   Kaliningrad

Spain

Tunisia

Ukraine

United States

 The Burlington and Northwestern Railway used an unknown hoist in the 1890s to run standard gauge cars on narrow gauge trucks.
 The Cairo and Fulton Railroad (5-foot gauge) used a Nutter hoist at Texarkana in the 1870s to exchange with standard gauge lines.
 The Denver and Rio Grande Western Railroad also used an unknown hoist in the 1890s to run standard gauge cars on narrow gauge trucks.
 The East Broad Top used their timber-transfer hoist in the 1930s to shift standard gauge cars onto narrow gauge trucks. In the early 2020's the heritage operation restoring the railroad, announced their intent to acquire several period appropriate standard gauge cars to regauge to represent the practice in photo charters. 
   The standard-gauge International–Great Northern Railroad and the narrow-gauge National Railroad of Mexico used an unknown hoist at Laredo, Texas in the 1890s to exchange trucks to permit through traffic.
 The Sedalia, Warsaw and South Western Railway used an unknown hoist in the 1890s to run standard gauge cars on narrow gauge trucks as well.  The accepted practice was to couple standard gauge cars immediately behind the engine, ahead of any narrow gauge cars in the train.
 The Virginia Midland Railway and the Richmond and Danville Railroad installed two Nutter car hoists in north Danville, Virginia in 1882 to deal with the break of gauge between those lines.

Transfer time 
Bogie exchange conversion times were:
 Dynon, Australia - one rail car every 7.3 minutes
 Brest - one rail car takes less than 1 hour
 Zabaykalsk - one rail car takes 5–6 hours
 Erenhot - one rail car takes 5–6 hours
 Cairo, Illinois - in 1874, 16-18 freight cars per hour (2 at a time), 15 minutes per Pullman car

Variable gauge axles 
Variable-gauge axles in an automatic track gauge changeover system (ATGCS) is a newer development and is faster than bogie exchange.

Axle exchange 
An alternative to variable gauge axles and bogie exchange is wheelset exchange.

See also 

 Eurasian Land Bridge
 Gauge conversion
 Mungindi railway line
 Qazaqstan Temir Zholy
 Ramsey car-transfer apparatus
 Rollbock
 SeaRail
 Transporter wagon
 Variable gauge axles 
 Wheelset

References

External links 
 
 

Track gauges
Rail transport operations
Bogie